Adolfo Ramírez (born 25 March 1922) was an Argentine wrestler. He competed at the 1948 Summer Olympics and the 1952 Summer Olympics.

References

External links
 

1922 births
Possibly living people
Argentine male sport wrestlers
Olympic wrestlers of Argentina
Wrestlers at the 1948 Summer Olympics
Wrestlers at the 1952 Summer Olympics
Sportspeople from Buenos Aires
Wrestlers at the 1951 Pan American Games
Pan American Games gold medalists for Argentina
Pan American Games medalists in wrestling
Medalists at the 1951 Pan American Games
20th-century Argentine people
21st-century Argentine people